Glisson is a surname. Notable people with the surname include:

Dorothy Glisson (1912–2001), American politician
Francis Glisson (died 1677), British physician, anatomist, and writer
Gordon Glisson (1930–1997), American jockey
James Glisson (born 1939), American politician
Michael Glisson, United States Army general
Oliver S. Glisson (1809–1890), United States Navy admiral